TRC Family Entertainment Limited is a family entertainment, trans-media and video game developer based in  Malta. Founded in 2011 by Malta Enterprise, Chris Deering (credited as one of the main marketers of the successful PlayStation and PlayStation 2 video game consoles earning him the title of "The Father of the PlayStation"), Paul Taylor (previous CEO of Jetix Europe), TRC Media Ireland Limited and a group of private investors, with the aim to develop an online world for children, similar to Club Penguin and a range of digital media products.. Malta Enterprise acquired 15% equity (equivalent to €4 million) together with another €4 million in investment aid. The studio managed to attract professionals from around the world to develop its first online world, and a range of other interconnected products for its intellectual property, Wishingtooth. The company had completed a testing and validation phase of the Wishingtooth brand, receiving impressive feedback and reviews from a core consumer group of over 18,000 families in the US. The company was the first family entertainment studio to be founded on the Mediterranean island of Malta, and has since been followed by multiple other games studios.

The company's lead investor, Euphoria Media (Ireland) Limited defaulted on its funding obligations towards the company in or around the second quarter of 2014. When this default occurred, Euphoria’s obligations were guaranteed, jointly and severally, by Euphoria Media (Ireland) Limited, and a director of the company, Simon R. Smith. Mr Smith made a number of payments under his contractual obligations, but the payments still fell short of what the company needed in order to service its own obligations and its operations were suspended in September 2014. The company continued with its efforts to secure payments from Mr Smith via legal action, that found him guilty of his obligations to the company both in Malta and in England and the efforts by the company produced judgments in the company’s favour in both countries. Mr. Smith made some payments to repay the majority of employees, after leaving staff unpaid for several months in 2014. When enforcement was made in the UK in 2017 this led to Mr Smith declaring himself bankrupt in August 2017 after failing to make further payments to the company.

The closure of TRC Family Entertainment caused a political storm, between the Malta Labour Party and the Nationalist party. The Economy Minister Chris Cardona asked the opposition to shoulder responsibility for investing in TRC despite due diligence exercise. Former finance minister Tonio Fenech said the due diligence had not concluded that any one of the directors had been involved in criminal activities, but there was a period in one of the directors life about which there was no information. The Prime Minister Joseph Muscat added that the director had a history of unsuccessful business ventures. He also highlighted that although in businesses bankruptcy was always a risk, the opposition had access to the due diligence report.

During its initial period of operation, conflicts between the management and the employees frequently rose to very high levels with the result that productivity was initially impaired.[1] A new management team was subsequently appointed to head the project and continue with operations with good progress being achieved until the default by Euphoria Media (Ireland) Limited and Simon R. Smith in 2014.

References 

Software companies of Malta
Msida